Armen Yuryevich Bagdasarov (born 31 July 1972) is an Uzbek-Armenian judoka. He is the first Olympic medalist for independent Uzbekistan.

Biography
Armen Bagdasarov was a member of the Uzbekistan national judo team from 1993 to 2001. The peak of his athletic career began in 1996, when he won a gold medal at the 1996 Asian Judo Championships and won an Olympic silver medal at the 1996 Summer Olympics in Atlanta. He later won a silver medal at the 1998 Asian Games and became a two-time Champion of Asia at the 1999 Asian Judo Championships. Bagdasarov also competed at the 2000 Summer Olympics without success. He also has a World Championship silver medal in kurash. For his sport achievements, Bagdasarov was awarded the title Honored Sportsman of the Republic of Uzbekistan. On the tenth anniversary of the independence of Uzbekistan, a series of stamps honoring athletes were published, one of which is dedicated to the sporting achievements of Armen Bagdasarov.

In 2001, Armen Bagdasarov completed his career and became the head coach of the Uzbekistan national judo team. Later, he headed the National Federation of Sports of Uzbekistan. At the same time, he is the Director of the National High School Sports Skills On Martial Arts. In 2006, he was awarded the honorary title Honored Coach of the Republic of Uzbekistan.

References

External links
 
 
 

1972 births
Living people
Sportspeople from Tashkent
Ethnic Armenian sportspeople
Uzbekistani male judoka
Olympic judoka of Uzbekistan
Judoka at the 1996 Summer Olympics
Judoka at the 2000 Summer Olympics
Olympic silver medalists for Uzbekistan
Olympic medalists in judo
Asian Games medalists in judo
Uzbekistani people of Armenian descent
Judoka at the 1998 Asian Games
Medalists at the 1996 Summer Olympics
Asian Games silver medalists for Uzbekistan
Medalists at the 1998 Asian Games
Universiade medalists in judo
Universiade silver medalists for Uzbekistan
Medalists at the 1999 Summer Universiade